Mark Russell (born August 23, 1932) is an American political satirist and comedian. He is best known for his series of semimonthly comedy specials on PBS television between 1975 and 2004. His routines were a mix of political stand-up humor covering current events and musical parodies in which he accompanied himself on his trademark American flag-themed piano.

Early life
Mark Russell was born Joseph Marcus Ruslander and grew up in Buffalo, New York, where he graduated from Canisius High School. After high school, his family briefly moved to Florida, then to Washington, D.C., where he enrolled at George Washington University, but stayed for only a month before joining the Marines.

Career
Beginning in the early 1960s, he was a regular entertainer at the Shoreham Hotel in Washington, D.C. and did his first PBS show in 1975. From 1979 to 1984, he was a correspondent on the NBC reality TV show Real People.  He also made brief appearances on all six episodes of the short lived Starland Vocal Band Show (CBS) during the summer of 1977.  

Russell's song parodies use melodies from old standards with new humorous lyrics pertinent to the subject matter. For example, in 1990, following the execution of the Romanian dictator Nicolae Ceaușescu, Russell did a parody song on his show to the tune of "Chattanooga Choo-Choo". ("Pardon me, boys / Are you the cats who shot Ceauşescu?") Russell himself admits that most of his jokes and songs are very topical and have "a shelf life shorter than cottage cheese".

Russell's humor is known for skewering Democrats and Republicans as well as third party, independent politicians and other prominent political (and sometimes nonpolitical) figures.

Russell has often been asked the question "Do you have any writers?" His standard response is "Oh, yes. I have 535 writers: One hundred in the Senate and 435 in the House of Representatives!" When asked if his views on current events are too caustic, Russell replies, "I follow the old newsman's adage. As they say, 'I don't make the news. I just report it.' And in my case, I don't even make the jokes. I just report them as they masquerade as news."

For several years, on the Sunday before Labor Day, Russell made annual appearances on Meet the Press, which was hosted from 1991 to 2008 by Tim Russert, also a Canisius High graduate.

Parody issues 
In 1994, Russell found himself unexpectedly allied with the rap group 2 Live Crew when the group was sued for copyright infringement for their parody of the song "Oh, Pretty Woman". The case went to the Supreme Court, where Russell and the members of 2 Live Crew argued that song parodies were protected under fair use. The Supreme Court agreed and ruled in favor of Russell and 2 Live Crew (Campbell v. Acuff-Rose Music, Inc.).

Retirement 

In 2010, Russell announced his retirement from public performances and made his last public performance in July 2010 in Chautauqua, New York. He continues to write political humor for various venues and also publishes jokes on his own website.

By 2013, Russell began to tour and perform publicly again. His final performance was October 30, 2016, at the Carolina Theatre in Greensboro, North Carolina.

In popular media
Russell was portrayed by Mark McKinney in a 1996 episode of Saturday Night Live.

Russell was parodied in an episode of The Simpsons (season three's "Mr. Lisa Goes to Washington") in which a character modeled on him sings songs including "The Deficit Rag" and "The Trading Gap Shuffle". Russell's music was also referenced in an episode of 30 Rock (season one's "The Source Awards").

In the NewsRadio episode "The Public Domain" (1997), Phil Hartman's character Bill McNeal is inspired by Russell to start a career as a singing political comedian.

For his PBS special's earlier years, an electronic version of "Yankee Doodle" was used in the opening sequence, which featured animated versions of an eagle, an elephant, and a donkey with Russell, dressed as Uncle Sam, being dragged by its tail marching across the screen. In later years, the opening sequence was a montage of a few of Russell's monologues accompanied by a Dixieland arrangement of Stars and Stripes Forever.  A similar arrangement of the song "Happy Days Are Here Again" was used for his entrance and as the closing theme.

Russell was referenced by Stan Smith's college government professor in the episode "Stan Moves to Chicago" from American Dad! (season 18). The professor said they despise comedy, except for Russell's piano routines.

Awards
In 2004 Russell was the recipient of the Buffalo Broadcasters Hall of Fame Buffalo Bob Award, which is awarded annually to a Buffalo native who has achieved success in broadcasting outside of the Niagara Frontier area.

Personal life
Russell lives in Parker, Colorado.

See also

Tom Lehrer
Randy Rainbow

References

External links
  
 

1932 births
Living people
American comedy musicians
American parodists
American satirists
George Washington University alumni
Parody musicians
Musicians from Buffalo, New York
United States Marines
Journalists from New York (state)
Comedians from New York (state)
20th-century American pianists
American male pianists
20th-century American male musicians